The 1919 Massachusetts gubernatorial election was held on November 4, 1919. This was the last gubernatorial election before the governor's term was extended to two years and the first election following the passage of the Nineteenth Amendment to the United States Constitution, which granted women the right to vote.

Governor Calvin Coolidge was re-elected over Framingham businessman Richard Long in a landslide. This was a rematch of the previous year's contest. Coolidge would be elected Vice President of the United States in 1920 and succeed President Warren Harding upon Harding's death.

Republican primary

Governor

Candidates
Calvin Coolidge, incumbent Governor

Governor Coolidge was unopposed for re-nomination.

Results

Lieutenant Governor

Candidates
Channing H. Cox, incumbent Lieutenant Governor

Lieutenant Governor Cox was unopposed for the re-nomination.

Results

Democratic primary

Governor

Candidates
Frederick Simpson Deitrick, former United States Representative
Eugene Foss, former Governor
Richard H. Long, nominee for Governor in 1918
George F. Monahan, former State Senator

Results

Lieutenant Governor

Candidates
 Joseph F. J. Herbert, World War I veteran and former managing editor of the Worcester Evening Post

Herbert was unopposed for the Democratic nomination.

General election

Results

See also
 1919 Massachusetts legislature

References

Bibliography

Governor
1919
Massachusetts
November 1919 events